Arnaud Jouffroy (born 21 February 1990) is a French professional cyclo-cross cyclist. After retiring in 2014, he returned to competition in 2019. He has also competed in road cycling and cross-country mountain biking.

Major results

Cyclo-cross

2005–2006
 1st  National Novice Championships
2006–2007
 1st  National Junior Championships
 UCI Junior World Cup
1st Hoogerheide
2007–2008
 1st  UCI Junior World Championships
 1st Overall UCI Junior World Cup
1st Milan
1st Hoogerheide
1st Kalmthout
1st Liévin
 1st  National Junior Championships
 2nd  UEC European Junior Championships
2008–2009
 1st  National Under-23 Championships
 1st Overall Coupe de France de cyclo-cross Under-23
1st Montrevel-en-Bresse
1st Le Creusot
1st Quelneuc
2009–2010
 1st  UCI World Under-23 Championships
 Gazet van Antwerpen Trophy Under-23
1st Grand Prix Sven Nys
 2nd National Under-23 Championships
 3rd Overall UCI Under-23 World Cup
2010–2011
 Gazet van Antwerpen Trophy Under-23
1st Cyclo-cross de la Citadelle
2013–2014
 2nd China International Cyclo-cross event

Road
2008
 1st Overall Tour de l'Abitibi
 1st Overall Giro della Toscana Juniors
2009
 1st Stage 3 (ITT) Tour de Martinique

Mountain Bike
2008
 1st  UCI World Team Relay Championships
 1st  UEC European Team Relay Championships
 2nd  UCI Junior World XCO Championships

References

External links
 
 
 

1990 births
Living people
French male cyclists
Cyclo-cross cyclists
People from Senlis
Sportspeople from Oise
Cyclists from Hauts-de-France
21st-century French people